Claudia Andrea Barbara Gesell (born 18 December 1977 in Tirschenreuth) is a former German middle distance runner who specialised in the 800 metres.

Achievements

External links 
 

1977 births
Living people
People from Tirschenreuth (district)
Sportspeople from the Upper Palatinate
German female middle-distance runners
German national athletics champions
Athletes (track and field) at the 2000 Summer Olympics
Athletes (track and field) at the 2004 Summer Olympics
Olympic athletes of Germany